Charles Izard may refer to:

 Charles Beard Izard (1829–1904), Member of Parliament and lawyer in Wellington, New Zealand
 Charles Hayward Izard (1860–1925), his son, Member of Parliament and lawyer in Wellington, New Zealand

See also
 Izard (disambiguation)